Fagon is a surname. Notable with the surname include:

 Alfred Fagon (1937–1986), Jamaican-born playwright, poet, and actor
 Guy-Crescent Fagon (1638–1718), French physician and botanist

See also
 Alfred Fagon Award
 Fagan